Filip Nikolic (Serbian: Филип Николић, Filip Nikolić; 1 September 1974 – 16 September 2009) was a French actor and singer of Serbian extraction, best known as the lead of the French band 2Be3.

Born at Saint-Ouen, Seine-Saint-Denis, he was raised with two siblings in Longjumeau, a suburb of Paris.

Filip was a French singer, but he also featured in acting roles in a TV shows such as Navarro and Pour être libre, a series centred on 2Be3. He also appeared in the US movie Simon Sez with Dennis Rodman in 1999. He was also runner-up in the French version of I'm a Celebrity...Get Me Out of Here! in 2006.

Death
He died on 16 September 2009, aged 35, reportedly while preparing a solo album. According to the first reports the cause of the death was a heart attack due to a combination of pills he used to get to sleep.

References

External links
 

1974 births
2009 deaths
People from Saint-Ouen-sur-Seine
French people of Serbian descent
French pop musicians
French male television actors
Drug-related deaths in France
20th-century French musicians